Max Brenner is an  Israeli multinational chocolate restaurant and retail brand headquartered in New York City, United States. The company operates more than 50 locations internationally, the majority (38) of which are in Australia. Other locations include eight in Israel, two in the United States, one each in New York City & Philadelphia, as well as in Japan, Singapore, Russia, and China. It specializes in decadent, chocolate-based desserts such as fondue, crepes, milkshakes, waffles, and hot chocolate, many of which it serves in signature utensils. Max Brenner is owned by Yaniv Shtanger and Dudu Vaknin.

Max Brenner chocolates are certified kosher by the Nazareth Illit Rabbinate.

History

1996–2001: An emerging company 
The firm was founded in 1996 in Ra'anana, Israel, by Max Fichtman and Oded Brenner who combined their names. The business began as a small shop selling handmade chocolates.

Working as an apprentice in Paris in 1994, Brenner met chocolatier Michel Chaudun and convinced the maestro to take him on. He spent the following six years learning the art of chocolate-making in Paris.

Upon his return to Israel in 1996, he opened a small retail chocolate shop with a workshop in the back, named "Handmade Chocolate by Max Brenner", name derived from Oded's last name and co-founder Max Fichtman's first name—in Ra’anana, just outside Tel Aviv. By 1999, Fichtman and Brenner had opened ten chocolate shops.

A chance meeting with an Israeli entrepreneur in 1999 sparked the idea of expanding his business, and the first of the Max Brenner-branded cafes opened in Australia, in Sydney's hip suburb of Paddington, in 2000. This newly opened “Max Brenner Chocolate Bar” was to be the centre of Max's new chocolate culture, combining a chocolate bar and a chocolate shop. This allowed people to enjoy a “holistic” chocolate adventure, experiencing their shopping in the bar section and shopping their experience in the shop section.

2001–2017: The Strauss years
In 2001, the chain became part of the Strauss, Israel's second-largest food and beverage company. In the period from 2002 to 2005, Max Brenner opened locations in Israel, Singapore and the Philippines, while continuing to open new locations in Australia. In 2006, Max Brenner opened their first chocolate bar in the United States in New York City.

In 2010, a new Max Brenner restaurant and chocolate store opened in the U.S. at Caesars Palace, Las Vegas, followed by another store opening in Boston and Philadelphia during the next year, offering both sweet and savory menu options.

In 2013, the company unveiled a new strategy, under which it started to move away from full-service restaurants and adopted a fast-casual concept named a Chocolate Bar. The first of these opened in Bethesda, Maryland in June 2013, with three more opening in Tokyo, Japan and Moscow, Russia via franchise agreements. The company opened its second US Chocolate Bar in Paramus, NJ in April 2014. In Australia, Max Brenner had expanded to 37 restaurants across Queensland, New South Wales, Victoria, the Northern Territory, and the Australian Capital Territory.

Since 2017: Independent again
In May 2017 Strauss group sold Max Brenner brand to Israeli franchisees Yaniv Shtanger and Dudu Vaknin for 18 million NIS (US$5 million).

On 1 October 2018 Max Brenner's Australian business went into voluntary administration, citing rising costs and sluggish retail trade. On 8 October 2018 20 of the 37 Australian Max Brenner locations were permanently closed. In November 2018 the Australian cinema owner and singer Roy Mustaca bought the 17 remaining Australian Max Brenner franchises out of receivership.

Max Brenner Australia is 100% Australian Owned
Max Brenner was introduced to Australia in 2000, with its first Chocolate Bar opening in Paddington, Sydney. For over twenty years, Max Brenner has shared its chocolate and dessert creations with Australian consumers and is renowned for its own-recipe chocolate, Hot Chocolates, Chocolate Fondue for Two, Tutti Frutti Waffles and Decadent Pizza’s as well as iconic crockery such as the Hug Mug.

In 2018, the business went into administration and Max Brenner’s Asia Pacific (APAC) arm was acquired by an Australian owned and operated family business (Vitocco Enterprises). With a newly appointed leadership team, Max Brenner has renewed its focus on building the brand for growth. The company now has strong national & international expansion plans, with its first international Chocolate Bar due to open in Queenstown, New Zealand at the end of 2021.

The Australian business is now independent of the Israel & US businesses with its Head Office located in Sydney, Australia. In 2021, 3 new Chocolate Bars have opened their doors at Ed Square, Edmondson Park, World Square, Sydney and Southland, Cheltenham. There are currently 25 Chocolate Bars in Australia.

Boycotts
The Strauss Group states on their website that they provide care packages to soldiers in the IDF's Golani Brigade, leading to activists targeting Max Brenner stores for boycotts Boycott, Divestment and Sanctions campaign.
In 2011, pro-Palestinian activist group Students for Palestine organized a series of protests outside Max Brenner outlets in Australia. The protest in Melbourne led to 19 arrests.

The protests have drawn condemnation from then Foreign Minister of Australia (and former Prime Minister) Kevin Rudd, who remarked “I don't think in 21st-century Australia there is a place for the attempted boycott of a Jewish business.” In September 2011, the Australian Competition & Consumer Commission said that "the protesters had not broken federal competition law because the protests did not cause substantial loss or damage to the Max Brenner chocolate stores." Some pro-Palestinian organizations including Australians for Palestine have distanced themselves from the protests but have publicly defended the choice of Max Brenner as a boycott target. In October 2011, Izzat Abdulhadi, head of the General Delegation of Palestine to Australia said that he is against the "full-scale" BDS campaign, and in particular expressed his anger over the occasionally violent protests at the Max Brenner stores, saying, "BDS is a non-violent process and I don't think it's the right of anybody to use BDS as a violent action or to prevent people from buying from any place."

Protest organizers consistently denied that the protests were violent, and instead accused the police of acting with brutality.

Julia Gillard denounced the planned protest against the Max Brenner shop on the Kensington campus of University of New South Wales, accusing the organizers of engaging in an ugly attempt to spread anti-Semitism and Holocaust-denial. In a survey conducted by the university to ascertain which new stores students and faculty wanted on campus, a Max Brenner chocolate shop was the second most popular choice. 
 
Max Brenner Australia spokespersons stated that the sole shareholders of the franchise operation in Australia are a young Australian couple who have no direct connection to the Strauss Group. The franchise employs over 1,100 Australian residents across four states.

In May 2013, The Australian newspaper reported on a YouTube video segment featuring an interview with Palestine Action Group Sydney spokesperson Patrick Harrison at a protest outside the Parramatta Max Brenner store. Harrison stated in the interview: "financially speaking there isn't really any connection between this Max Brenner store in particular and Israel," and that the retail outlet has become a "cultural ambassador for Israel", which the newspaper used to argue that protests were unjustified. In response, the Palestine Action Group pointed out earlier reports by the Australian acknowledging that Max Brenner is a brand of the Strauss Group. Harrison responded by pointing out that Max Brenner's Australian franchise operations are referenced in the Strauss Group's annual report, and argued that the Australian franchisees should hand back their licenses to Strauss to signal their opposition to Strauss's support for the Israeli occupation.

In the early 2010s BDS activists protested outside the Clarendon St, South Melbourne, store handing leaflets to people passing by. In October 2014 this store closed.

Awards and recognition

In April 2014, Max Brenner won the 2014 Webby Awards in the food and drink category, for the best website by both the public and the academy's panel of experts.

Gallery

References

External links

Official Website
 

Food and drink companies of Israel
Israeli brands
Restaurant chains in Israel
Restaurants established in 1996
American chocolate companies
Brand name chocolate
1996 establishments in Israel